The Roman Catholic Diocese of Montelíbano is a diocese located in the city of Montelíbano in the Ecclesiastical province of Cartagena in Colombia. It has 38 priests and 31 religious.

History
 12 June 1924: Established as Apostolic Prefecture of Sinú from the Metropolitan Archdiocese of Cartagena
 12 January 1931 Renamed as Apostolic Prefecture of Sinú-San Jorge
 10 March 19500: Promoted as Apostolic Vicariate of San Jorge
 25 April 1969: Promoted as Territorial Prelature of Alto Sinú
 29 December 1998: Promoted as Diocese of Montelíbano

Leadership, in reverse chronological order
 Bishops of Montelíbano (Roman rite), below
 Bishop Farly Yovany Gil Betancur (2020.03.04 - )
 Bishop Luis José Rueda Aparicio (2012.02.02 - 2018.05.19), appointed Archbishop of Popayán
 Bishop Edgar de Jesús Garcia Gil (2002.10.28 – 2010.05.24), appointed Bishop of Palmira
 Bishop Julio César Vidal Ortiz (1998.12.29 – 2001.10.31), appointed Bishop of Montería; see below
 Prelates of Alto Sinú (Roman rite), below
 Bishop Julio César Vidal Ortiz (1993.12.16 – 1998.12.29); see above
 Bishop Flavio Calle Zapata (1989.02.16 – 1993.02.16), appointed Bishop of Sonsón-Rionegro; future Archbishop
 Bishop Alfonso Sánchez Peña, C.M.F. (1969.07.28 – 1989.02.16)
 Vicars Apostolic of San Jorge (Roman rite), below
 Bishop Eloy Tato Losada, I.E.M.E. (1960.05.03 – 1969.04.25), appointed Bishop of Magangué 
 Bishop José Lecuona Labandibar, I.E.M.E. (1958.07.04 – 1959.10.20)
 Bishop Francisco Santos Santiago, P.I.M.E. (1950.03.12 – 1957.12.25)
 Prefect Apostolic of Sinú-San Jorge (Roman rite), below
 Fr. Marcellino Lardizábal Aguirrebengoa, I.E.M.E. (1931.01.12 – 1949); see below
 Prefect Apostolic of Sinú (Roman rite), below
 Fr. Marcellino Lardizábal Aguirrebengoa, I.E.M.E. (1925.03.04 – 1931.01.12); see above

See also
Roman Catholicism in Colombia

Sources

External links
 Catholic Hierarchy
 GCatholic.org

Roman Catholic dioceses in Colombia
Roman Catholic Ecclesiastical Province of Cartagena
Christian organizations established in 1924
Roman Catholic dioceses and prelatures established in the 20th century